James Tennant may refer to:

 James Tennant (mineralogist) (1808–1881), English mineralogist
 James Tennant (RFC officer) (1896–?), Scottish World War I flying ace
 James Tennant (army officer) (1789–1854), British soldier
 James Francis Tennant (1829–1915), British soldier and astronomer
 Jim Tennant (1907–1967), American baseball player

See also
 James Tennent (1888–1955), Scottish international rugby and cricket player
 James Emerson Tennent (1804–1869), Irish politician and traveller